Botiza is a commune in Maramureș County, Maramureș, Romania. The commune is well known for its handmade wool carpets. It is composed of a single village, Botiza, also including Poienile Izei until the latter was split off to form a separate commune in 1995.

References

Botiza
Localities in Romanian Maramureș